This is a list of airports in Jamaica, grouped by type and sorted by location.

List of airports by name 

Names shown in bold indicate the airport has scheduled passenger service on commercial airlines.

See also 

 Transport in Jamaica
 List of airports by ICAO code: M#MK - Jamaica
 Wikipedia: WikiProject Aviation/Airline destination lists: North America#Jamaica

References 
 Airports Authority of Jamaica
 Jamaica Civil Aviation Authority
 , contains list of aerodromes in Jamaica
 
  - includes IATA codes
 Great Circle Mapper: Airports in Jamaica, reference for airport codes
 World Aero Data: Airports in Jamaica, reference for coordinates

Footnotes

 
Jamaica
Airports
Airports
Jamaica